Sripurandan (South) is a village in the Udayarpalayam taluk of Ariyalur district, Tamil Nadu, India.

Demographics 

As per the 2001 census, Sripurandan (South) had a total population of 2214 with 1119 males and 1095 females.

References 

Villages in Ariyalur district